Abdul Salam al-Buseiri (born 1898) was the Foreign Minister of Libya from 1954 to 1957.

He became Governor of Tripoli (1954–1955), and then Ambassador of Libya to London.

References

1898 births
Year of death missing
Foreign ministers of Libya
Ambassadors of Libya to the United Kingdom